"Heart in Hand" is a song written by Jackie DeShannon and Sharon Sheeley and performed by Brenda Lee.  The song reached No.4 on the adult contemporary chart and No.15 on the Billboard Hot 100 in 1962. It reached No. 37 in Australia.

References

1962 songs
1962 singles
Songs written by Jackie DeShannon
Songs written by Sharon Sheeley
Brenda Lee songs
Decca Records singles
Song recordings produced by Owen Bradley